Catalan Bay Cave is a cave in the British Overseas Territory of Gibraltar. In historic times, this cave offered shelter for the first Genoese inhabitants of Catalan Bay.

See also
List of caves in Gibraltar

References

Caves of Gibraltar